Mária Honzová (born 17 December 1969) is a Czech orienteering competitor.

Career 
Honzová received a bronze medal in the relay event at the 1993 World Orienteering Championships in West Point, together with Petra Novotná, Marcela Kubatková and Jana Cieslarová. In the 1995 World Championships in Detmold she again received a bronze medal in relay, with the same Czech team.

She finished 14th in the classic distance in 1993, 16th in the short distance in 1995, and 20th in the short distance in Grimstad in 1997.

See also
 Czech orienteers
 List of orienteers
 List of orienteering events

References

1969 births
Living people
Czech orienteers
Female orienteers
Foot orienteers
World Orienteering Championships medalists